NEO Tower, or NEO Lvjiing Plaza (Chinese:NEO绿景广场) is an office complex in Shenzhen, China consisting of a main building 273 meters and 56-storey tall. Construction started in 2007 and was completed in 2011.

See also
 List of tallest buildings in Shenzhen

References 

Skyscraper office buildings in Shenzhen

Office buildings completed in 2011